Rental store, shop or market may refer to:

 Video rental shop
 Rent-to-own
 Car rental
 Equipment rental